Anton Praetorius (1560 – 6 December 1613) was a German Calvinist pastor who spoke out against the persecution of witches (witchhunts, witchcraft trials) and against torture.

Life and writings 

Praetorius was born in Lippstadt as the son of Matthes Schulze. He later changed his name to the Latin Praetorius. He studied theology and became principal of the humanistic Latin school in Kamen, Westphalia. There, he married, but his wife Maria died of the plague. They had one child, Johannes.

As the first Calvinist pastor in the parish of Dittelsheim, he undertook a trip to Heidelberg, the centre of Calvinist theology in Germany. Praetorius was so impressed by the Great Wine Barrel in Heidelberg Castle that he published a poem with the title "Vas Heidelbergense" in October 1595, praising its size as an apparent proof of the superiority of the Calvinist religion.

In his poem on Wolfgang Ernst, Count of Ysenburg, Büdingen and Birstein ("De pii magistratus officio"), he asked the Christian governments for a reformation of nation and church along the principles of the Bible and the Calvinist faith. Subsequently, the count called him as a princely preacher to his castle in Birstein near Frankfurt.

In the town of Birstein, Praetorius published church songs, a catechism, and a book for families about Christian education in 1597. In 1602, he made a contribution to the discussion about the interpretation of the Last Supper and the Sacraments in his book De Sacrosanctis novi foederis Jesu Christi.

Fight against the persecution of witches

In 1597 Praetorius was appointed as pastor to the Count of Büdingen/ Ysenburg in Birstein and had to witness the torture of 4 women accused of witchcraft.

According to the court records, Reverend Praetorius was so upset about the torture of the accused women that he pressed for a stop in the trial against the last surviving woman. His protest against the torture can be found in the record of the witch-trial of Birstein 1597: "As the pastor has violently protested against the torture of the women, it has therefore been stopped this time." As a consequence Anton Praetorius was dismissed by the count.

In his new parochy in Laudenbach near Heidelberg he wrote the book Gründlicher Bericht über Zauberey und Zauberer (Thorough Report about Witchcraft and Witches) to protest against torture and the prosecution of witches. At first he published the book in 1598 under the name of his son Johannes Schulze ("Johannes Scultetus"). In 1602 he dared to publish the book under his own name. The book was published again in 1613 and posthumously in 1629.

Praetorius was one of the first to describe the terrible situation of the prisoners and to protest against torture, and with his "Bericht" Praetorius publicly objected to the prevailing attitude in the church (a view held by Roman Catholics as well as Protestants such as Martin Luther and John Calvin) on the torture and burning of witches. Praetorius died in Laudenbach.

Publications (German and Latin)

 Vas Heidelbergense, Heidelberg, October 1595 (Poem about the 1. Great Wine Barrel in the Castle of Heidelberg. Only one remaining print, translated into German by Burghard Schmanck)
  (Poem on Wolfgang Ernst, Earl of Ysenburg, Büdingen and Birstein). Heidelberg, Printed by Christoph Löw, 1596 (Only one remaining print, translated into German by Burghard Schmanck)
 Hauptstück (catechism) . Printed in Lich by Nicolaum Erbenium. 1597. Only one remaining print, fragment
 , (conversation in the family about Christian education) Printed in Lich 1597
 . (Thorough Report about Witchcraft and Witches) By Joannem Scultetum Westphalo camensem. (Johannes Scultetum is a pseudonym of Anton Praetorius) printed in Lich by Nicolas Erbenis. 1598
 . Poem for the wedding of Jan Gruter, (translated into German by Burghard Schmanck) 1601 (Only one remaining print)
 , (Thorough Report about Witchcraft and Witches) printed in Lich/ 1602
  (about the sacraments) printed by Wolgangus Kezelius and Conradus Nebenius, Lich 1602
  (Poem for a wedding of a pastor) Lancellotus Heidelberg (only one remaining print)
 , (Thorough Report about Witchcraft and Witches) printed 1613 in Heidelberg by Johann Lancellot/ Andreae Cambier.
 , (Thorough Report about Witchcraft and Witches) printed 1629 in Frankfurt am Main by Johann Niclas Stoltzenbergern/ Johann Carl Unckels
 several handwritten letters

Tributes

The church of Laudenbach displays a plaque in memory of Praetorius and on May 7, 2015 the city of Lippstadt named a path in his honor.

References

Bibliography (in German)
 Hartmut Hegeler: Anton Praetorius, Kämpfer gegen Hexenprozesse und Folter, (fighter against the persecution of witches and against torture) Unna, 2002 
 Hartmut Hegeler und Stefan Wiltschko: Anton Praetorius und das 1. Große Fass von Heidelberg, (the 1. Great Wine Barrel in the Castle of Heidelberg) Unna, 2003 
 Anton Praetorius, De Sacrosanctis Sacramentis novi foederis Jesu Christi, Eine reformatorische Sakramentenlehre von 1602 über die hochheiligen Sakramente des Neuen Bundes Jesu Christi (teachings about the sacraments) Lateinische Originalschrift (the original writing in Latin with a translation into German, translated by Burghard Schmanck), herausgegeben und übersetzt von Burghard Schmanck, Bautz Verlag, Nordhausen 2010,

External links
 (Biographisch-Bibliographisches Kirchenlexikon, Verlag Traugott Bautz)
 biography and literature about Anton Praetorius
 reprinted text of the "Bericht" of Praetorius 1613
 Biography including coloured pictures
 Praetorius as pastor in Dittelsheim (with pictures)
 biography
 (Latin texts of Praetorius)
 Latin text der Schrift von Praetorius Das 1. Große Fass von Heidelberg
 De sacrosanctis, Homilia quinta: De infantibus ante baptismum mortuis Latin text 

1560 births
1613 deaths
16th-century Calvinist and Reformed theologians
16th-century German writers
16th-century German male writers
16th-century Latin-language writers
17th-century Calvinist and Reformed theologians
17th-century German Protestant theologians
17th-century German writers
17th-century German male writers
17th-century Latin-language writers
Calvinist and Reformed hymnwriters
German biographers
German Calvinist and Reformed theologians
German Calvinist and Reformed ministers
German Protestant hymnwriters
German Renaissance humanists
German male non-fiction writers
Male biographers
Penologists
People from Lippstadt
Critics of witch hunting
Witchcraft in Germany